Lieutenant General Jonathan David "Jacko" Page,  (born 25 February 1959) is a retired senior British Army officer.

Early life
Page was born in Norwich, Norfolk on 25 February 1959.

Military career
Page commissioned into the Parachute Regiment in 1981. In 1989, he commanded an armoured squadron of the Royal Scots Dragoon Guards and deployed to the Middle East for Operation Granby, the British military contribution to the Gulf War.

As well as staff posts in the Ministry of Defence, he has served as Chief of Staff of 24 Airmobile Brigade and with UNPROFOR in Sarajevo, Bosnia and Herzegovina. He assumed command of 16 Air Assault Brigade in December 2002, which deployed as part of Operation Telic, the British contribution to the 2003 invasion of Iraq.

On 1 May 2007, he replaced Dutch Major General Ton van Loon as Regional Command South in Afghanistan for a six-month period. This NATO ISAF command was responsible for southern Afghanistan, where some of the most intensive combat operations against the Taliban took place. Then in 2008 he was appointed General Officer Commanding 6th Division (a new divisional headquarters in York), and in 2009 he was appointed Director Special Forces. He went on to be Commander Force Development and Training in February 2012 with the rank of lieutenant general.

Page was appointed Companion of the Order of the Bath (CB) in the 2009 New Year Honours.

References

|-

|-
 

1959 births
British Army generals
British Army personnel of the Falklands War
British Army personnel of the Gulf War
British Army personnel of the Iraq War
British Army personnel of the War in Afghanistan (2001–2021)
British Parachute Regiment officers
Companions of the Order of the Bath
Living people
Officers of the Order of the British Empire
Recipients of the Commendation for Valuable Service
Military personnel from Norwich